Fatoua villosa is an annual herb in the Moraceae (mulberry) family. Common names include mulberry weed, crabweed, or hairy crabweed in English, Kuwakusa (クワクサ（桑草）/クワ科クワクサ属) in Japanese, and Shui she ma (小蛇麻 or 水蛇麻) in Mandarin. It is native to eastern Asia, some Pacific islands, and parts of Australia (specifically in  two Australian states (Western and Queensland) Bismarck Archipelago, China, Japan, Indonesia (Java, Maluku, Sulawesi), Korea, Lesser Sunda Island, New Guinea, Philippines, Solomon Islands, Taiwan, Thailand, Vietnam). It has become an invasive species in the United States where it grows in disturbed areas such as flowerbeds, greenhouses, and agricultural fields.

Description

F. villosa is an annual herb, and sometimes perennial herb in the deep south of the US. The entire plant is covered in both glandular and recurved hairs giving the plant a sticky feeling to the touch. The leaves resemble the leaves of mulberry giving rise to the common name of mulberry-weed. The leaves are heart shaped and up to 10 cm long with a crenate leaf margin. At the base of each leaf is a pair of stipules. It is a monoecious plant meaning that it has separate male and female flowers on the same plant. The male and female flowers are aggregated into axillary clusters. The fruit is single seeded and explosively shoots the seed up to several meters.

Invasive

Mulberry weed has been collected extensively in flowerbeds and greenhouses which strongly suggests that the plant is spread via horticultural material. It was first reported in Louisiana in 1964 and has since spread as far north as Michigan and Massachusetts and as far west as California. It will likely continue to spread and may become more invasive.

Bibliography

External link

Moraceae
Flora of North America